Ciro Palmieri (born 1 February 2000) is an Italian footballer who plays as an attacker for Italian club Nocerina.

Career
At the age of 13, Palmieri trialed for the youth academy of Chelsea, one of England's most successful clubs, amid interest from the youth academies of Arsenal and Fulham in the English Premier League but the transfer never happened.

In 2020, he signed for French Ligue 1 side Lille from the youth academy of Napoli in the Italian Serie A, before being sent on loan to Italian third division club Fermana.

In August 2021 he was signed by Nocerina.

References

External links
 
 

2000 births
Living people
Footballers from Naples
Italian footballers
Association football forwards
Serie C players
Lille OSC players
Fermana F.C. players
Italian expatriate footballers
Italian expatriate sportspeople in France
Expatriate footballers in France